Devin "DJ" Benton (born November 18, 1999) is an American soccer player who currently plays for North Carolina FC in USL League One.

Career

Youth
Born in Birmingham, Alabama, Benton played club soccer with Hoover Soccer Club, before joining the Atlanta United academy in 2016, and later the Houston Dynamo academy. In the summer of 2018, Benton also appeared for Houston's USL PDL affiliate side Brazos Valley Cavalry, making four appearances.

College
In 2018, Benton attended the University of Alabama at Birmingham to play college soccer. In two seasons with the Blazers, Benton made 34 appearances.

Professional
On August 27, 2021, Benton signed a professional deal with USL League One side North Texas SC. He made his debut the following day, appearing as an 88th-minute substitute during a 0–0 draw with Union Omaha.

Benton signed with Chattanooga Red Wolves SC on January 14, 2022.

Beno joined North Carolina FC on December 27, 2022.

References 

1999 births
Living people
American soccer players
Association football defenders
Brazos Valley Cavalry FC players
Chattanooga Red Wolves SC players
North Carolina FC players
North Texas SC players
Soccer players from Birmingham, Alabama
UAB Blazers men's soccer players
USL League One players
USL League Two players